Chlorella volutis is a species of euryhaline, unicellular microalga in the Division Chlorophyta. It is spherical to oval-shaped, is solitary and lacks a mucilaginous envelope.

References

Further reading

Bashan, Yoav, et al. "Chlorella sorokiniana (formerly C. vulgaris) UTEX 2714, a non-thermotolerant microalga useful for biotechnological applications and as a reference strain." Journal of Applied Phycology (2015): 1–9.
Bock, Christina, et al. "Classification of crucigenoid algae: phylogenetic position of the reinstated genus Lemmermannia, Tetrastrum spp. Crucigenia tetrapedia, and C. lauterbornii (Trebouxiophyceae, Chlorophyta) 1." Journal of Phycology 49.2 (2013): 329–339.

External links
WORMS

volutis